At Home with the Kids is a charity compilation album released by Atlantic Records on August 28, 2020.

Track listing
 Portugal. The Man, "Tomorrow"
 Sia, "Riding on My Bike"
 Royal & the Serpent, "The ABC Song"
 Shelley FKA DRAM, "Twinkle Twinkle Little Star"
 Chromeo, "Georgy Porgy"
 Kyle, "Pickle"
 Anderson East, "I Ain't No Zebra I'm a Bumblebee"
 Gnash, "Night Night"
 Christina Perri, "It's a Small World"
 Ema Jo Cobb, "Hawaii"
 Midland, "Farmer John"
 Ben Abraham, "Eat Your Food"
 Charlotte Cardin, "Hush Little Baby"
 Charlotte Lawrence, "Lavender's Blue"
 IV Jay, "Rock A Bye Baby"
 Matt Maeson, "Giants"
 Chloe Moriondo, "Oh My Darling Clementine"
 A/J from Saint Motel, "Big Ol World"
 A Thousand Horses, "The Golden Rule"
 Aaron Raitiere, "If You Love Yo Mama"
 The Knocks, "Star Design"
 Tove Lo, "Buzz Buzz Hop Hop"
 Winona Oak, "Who Can Sail"

References

2020 compilation albums
Atlantic Records compilation albums
Charity albums
Children's music albums